Sergei Sakhnovski (born May 15, 1975) is an Israeli ice dancer. With partner Galit Chait, he is the 2002 World bronze medalist for Israel. With previous partner Ekaterina Svirina, he is the 1993 World Junior champion for Russia.

Career 
Sakhnovski began skating at age four and took up ice dancing when he was eight. Early in his career, he skated with Marina Anissina and Ekaterina Svirina. With Svirina, he won the World Junior Championships in 1993 and took the silver medal in 1994.

He teamed up with Galit Chait in 1995. They initially trained in Russia with Ludmila Buytskova and Elena Maslenikova and then moved to Monsey, New York. In 2002, they were the first Israeli ice dance team to win a medal (bronze) at World Championships. They competed in three Olympics, finishing 14th in 1998, 6th in 2002, and 8th in 2006. Their coaches included Natalia Dubova, Tatiana Tarasova, Evgeni Platov, Natalia Linichuk and Gennadi Karponosov.

Programs 
(with Chait)

Competitive highlights
GP: Champions Series / Grand Prix

With Chait

With Svirina

See also
List of select Jewish figure skaters

References

External links

 
 Official homepage – Chait / Sakhnovski (archived)

1975 births
Living people
Israeli male ice dancers
Russian male ice dancers
Figure skaters from Moscow
Figure skaters at the 1998 Winter Olympics
Figure skaters at the 2002 Winter Olympics
Figure skaters at the 2006 Winter Olympics
Olympic figure skaters of Israel
Israeli people of Russian descent
People from Woodbridge Township, New Jersey
World Figure Skating Championships medalists
World Junior Figure Skating Championships medalists
People from Monsey, New York
Goodwill Games medalists in figure skating
Competitors at the 1994 Goodwill Games